Jim Smith (born 11 February 1887) was an  Australian rules footballer who played with South Melbourne in the Victorian Football League (VFL).

Notes

External links 

Year of death missing
1887 births
Australian rules footballers from Victoria (Australia)
Sydney Swans players